Christian James Vásquez Pérez (born 3 January 2001) is a Peruvian footballer who plays as a right-back for Peruvian Primera División side UTC Cajamarca.

Career

Melgar
Vásquez joined FBC Melgar from Canteras Perú in Lima in 2017. In his first season in Melgar, Vásquez played for the clubs reserve team.

18-year old Vásquez got his official debut for Melgar in a Peruvian Primera División game against Real Garcilaso on 8 April 2018. Shortly after his debut, Vásquez was also summoned to the Peruvian U-20 national team. After four games for the first team in the 2018 season, Vásquez signed a new contract with Melgar on 10 October 2018 until the end of 2020. In 2019 season, Vásquez only managed to play one game for the first team.

UTC Cajamarca
In the search of more playing time, Vásquez joined UTC Cajamarca in January 2020. In his first season, he made a total of seven appearances.

In December 2021, after making 12 appearances during the season, he renewed his contract until the end of 2022.

References

External links
 

People from Cajamarca
Living people
1999 births
Association football defenders
Peruvian footballers
Peruvian Primera División players
FBC Melgar footballers
Universidad Técnica de Cajamarca footballers